Alexander Leo Soldenhoff (1882-1951) was a Swiss artist and aircraft designer. Born in Switzerland, he lived for much of his life in Germany.

In 1906 he married Anna Zweifler from Glarus. They separated in 1947, only a few years before his death.

Painting
Alexander Soldenhoff trained as an artist and during the early 1900s was employed as an art teacher.

His aeronautical work interrupted his career as a painter, but he would return to it from time to time when he ran out of money to build more aeroplanes.

Aircraft
Soldenhoff became interested in aviation during the pioneer years of the twentieth century. After the end of WWI he determined to develop a tailless swept-wing "safety aeroplane" after the manner of designs already produced from 1909.

He built his first full-size glider and began attempts to fly in 1915. He completed the Bülbül I in July 1928 and entered it in that year's Rhön competition but it was blown backwards and damaged before he could launch it.

His subsequent aircraft would all be tailless swept-wing, single-engined types with a short fuselage and pusher propeller, although he envisaged some much larger and more complex designs. The examples which flew included:

 V 1, later redesignated So A/1. 1927.
 LF 5 "Berliner", later redesignated So A/2. 1929. Flown by Gottlob Espenlaub (the design is sometimes also mistakenly attributed to him).
 So A/3 "Düsseldorfer". 1930. Soldenhoff's most successful design.
 So A/4 "Böblingerin". 1931.
 So A/5, a second "Böblingerin". 1931.
 SL 1. 1936. Flew briefly. Now on display as the S-5 in the Verkehrshaus der Schweiz (Swiss Museum of Transport}, Lucerne.

References

 Frost, Gunter; Die Flugzeuge des Alexander Soldenhoff (The Aeroplanes of Alexander Soldenhoff), Parts 1-3,  Flugzeugwerke und andere Luftfahrtbetriebe, Arbeitsgemeinschaft Deutsche Luftfahrthistorik (ADL), 2016. (In German) (Retrieved 15 March 2022)
 Alexander Soldenhoff, Böblinger Flughafengeschichten. (In German) (Retrieved 15 March 2022)
T. Wooldridge; Winged Wonders, Smithsonian. 1985. pp. 28 ff.

Aircraft designers
Swiss painters
1882 births
1951 deaths
Swiss expatriates in Germany